The Mount Vernon Ladies' Association (MVLA) is a non-profit organization that preserves and maintains the Mount Vernon estate originally owned by the family of President George Washington. The association was founded in 1853 by Ann Pamela Cunningham of South Carolina, and is the oldest national historic preservation organization – as well as the oldest patriotic women's society – in the United States.

Cunningham appointed 30 vice regents nationwide – one woman per state – who together raised $200,000 to purchase the property (equivalent to $4.1 million in 2003 dollars). The MVLA took over operation of the Mount Vernon estate on February 22, 1860, and opened the site as a museum. Through historic preservation of a national symbol, the Mount Vernon Ladies' Association hoped to transcend or "heal" the sectional divisions that were deepening over the issue of slavery in the United States. During the American Civil War, the MVLA's restoration efforts were put on hold, but resumed in 1866.

Today, the MVLA continues its original mission, relying solely on private contributions, and is overseen by a board of regents made up of women from 27 states.

Background
After the deaths of George Washington in 1799 and his widow Martha in 1802, Mount Vernon remained in the Washington family for three generations. John Augustine Washington III, a great grandnephew of George Washington, eventually inherited the property, but he could not afford to maintain it. By the mid-1800s, the iconic Mansion House Farm had fallen into disrepair. In 1853, he offered to sell the estate to the Commonwealth of Virginia, which refused because the asking price was too high. John Augustine Washington also offered to sell Mount Vernon to the federal government, but key members of Congress argued that the government should not be responsible for preserving every historical site.

According to popular legend, on a moonlit night in 1853, Louisa Bird Cunningham was riding a steamboat on the Potomac River, when the ferry captain sounded the horn as they passed Mount Vernon. Cunningham, the mistress of Rosemont Plantation in South Carolina, was appalled to see the badly deteriorated condition of Washington's home. Writer Gerald W. Johnson later described the sight she saw:The paint was peeling from the walls, the roof was sagging, at least one of the great pillars along the front had collapsed and been replaced by scantlings, the lawn was waist-high in rioting weeds. It was a picture of neglect, decay, and desolation, and the passenger could not get it out of her mind. 

Cunningham had the idea that the site should be repaired and preserved as a national "shrine." The next day, Louisa wrote to her daughter, Ann Pamela Cunningham. According to the MVLA, she said: If the men of America have seen fit to allow the home of its most respected hero to go to ruin, why can't the women of America band together to save it?Galvanized by her mother's words, 37-year-old Ann Pamela Cunningham decided to take up the cause of rescuing and restoring Mount Vernon. The younger Cunningham, who suffered from chronic pain as the result of a horseriding accident, ignored the advice of friends and other relatives who initially tried to dissuade her in light of her poor health.

Inception of fundraising campaign

Initial focus on Southern states 
At first, Ann Pamela Cunningham focused her efforts on mobilizing women from the American South to raise funds to save Mount Vernon. An initial concern was that "Northern capitalists" and speculators might intervene to purchase Mount Vernon and turn it into a hotel resort. 

On December 2, 1853, Cunningham wrote an open letter titled "Appeal to the Ladies of the South" using the nom-de-plume "A Southern Matron". The letter was first published in the Charleston Mercury and subsequently appeared in other newspapers. In the letter, she urged other Southern women to join her in protecting the "sanctity" of Mount Vernon from desecration by greedy businessmen and corrupt politicians. Her argument that the virtuous, patriotic women of the republic should take action to safeguard a national symbol was particularly bold given the social norms of the time, which "deemed [it] improper for a lady to take part in public affairs."

Cunningham also wrote to Eleanor Washington to try to convince her husband to hold off on selling Mount Vernon until "the Southern ladies" raised the required funds, which they hoped to turn over to the governor of Virginia for the eventual purchase of the estate.

On February 22, 1854, the first public fundraising meeting took place in South Carolina in Cunningham's home, raising $293.75. On July 12, 1854, a second meeting to discuss for formation of an association took place in Richmond, Virginia, attended by 30 ladies and several gentlemen including Governor Joseph Johnson. Additional fundraising activity took place in Georgia and Alabama.

Inclusion of Northern women 
By the fall of 1854, women from Northern states were expressing interest in joining the cause, saying that "Washington belonged to the whole country." Cunningham realized that she needed their help as well, given the difficulty of raising $200,000 to purchase Mount Vernon. 

Keenly aware of the sensitivities between North and South, Ann Pamela Cunningham strove to make the movement more inviting and inclusive of Northern women without alienating her Southern supporters. Many including her own mother preferred to keep the effort to save Mount Vernon an "all Southern" affair. Cunningham argued that the virtue and patriotism of American women would enable them to reject and transcend the sectionalism which was threatening to tear the Union apart.

Sectional tensions surfaced nonetheless. The Philadelphia committee planned to distribute pamphlets stating that the title of Mount Vernon would be given to the U.S. Congress. When Cunningham informed them that title would be given to the state of Virginia, the Philadelphia committee "dropped the whole like a hot potato" and considered sending their own delegation to ask Congress to buy it instead. 

Meanwhile, the Virginia state committee declared that as representatives of the "native state of Washington," it should be recognized as the predominant committee, undermining Cunningham's efforts to encourage Unionwide cooperation. Cunningham regarded the Virginia committee's actions as insubordinate and took steps to nullify their proceedings. The power struggle resulted in the resignation of Mary Anderson Gilmer, whose husband John H. Gilmer had argued that the inclusion of Northern women was an "unholy alliance" that would "tarnish the soil of Virginia with the polluted breath of Northern fanaticism."

Legislative charter 
On the advice of John M. Berrien, a former U.S. senator from Georgia and attorney general under President Andrew Jackson, Ann Pamela Cunningham moved to establish the "Mount Vernon Association" as the equivalent of a modern nonprofit corporation. By acquiring a legislative charter from the Virginia General Assembly, Cunningham would also consolidate her position as the organization's principal officer.

Following the sudden death of Berrien, James L. Petigru, a former attorney general of South Carolina and a staunch Unionist, took over drafting the charter, and inserted the word "Ladies'" and added "of the Union" to the name of the association. 

One of the key advocates of the 1856 charter was Anna Cora Mowatt, a well-known actress who had recently married William Foushee Ritchie, a son of Thomas Ritchie whose family was influential in Virginia state politics. Mrs. Ritchie had first met Cunningham in the fall of 1854 and promptly accepted the position of Secretary of the Central Committee of the early Mount Vernon Association. In the weeks leading up to the bill's introduction in the Virginia legislature, Anna Cora Mowatt Ritchie held many gatherings in her home to build male support for the MVLA. As Mrs. Ritchie reported to Cunningham:I have been electioneering, and very successfully. Night before last I gave a musical soiree, and desired my husband to invite as many of the Senators and members of the legislature as the house would hold... Everyone declared he had a delightful evening. The music was excellent, and the supper good. Then came the grand coup. As the Ladies began to retire, Mrs. Pellet commenced the subject with [former] Governor Floyd, and I soon managed to make it general. Governor Floyd pledged himself to pass our bill and at once – so did all the other members and Senators present.On March 15, 1856, O.W. Langfitt, an attorney from Richmond, Virginia, carried the bill to the Virginia legislature. The bill initially encountered opposition stirred by disgruntled former members of the Virginia committee who let it be known that there had been internal strife within the organization. In addition, there had been hostility and skepticism that such an ambitious and far-reaching plan was being spearheaded by a woman. In the absence of Cunningham, who was unwell and bedridden, Anna Cora Mowatt Ritchie stepped in to rally their allies to resume consideration of the bill and ultimately pass the association's founding charter.

On March 19, 1856, the Virginia state assembly passed a bill establishing the Mount Vernon Ladies' Association of the Union with Ann Pamela Cunningham named as the presiding leader. The charter also allowed the association to enter into a contract to hold title to the Mount Vernon estate.

Nationwide organization

Appointment of vice regents in each state 

As regent of the newly established Mount Vernon Ladies' Association of the Union, Ann Pamela Cunningham turned to building the nationwide organization. Working with a small personal staff, she appointed a "Vice Regent" in each state to lead fundraising. In turn, each vice regents appointed "Lady Managers" to assist in specific areas within their state. The vice regents appointed by Cunningham generally came from wealthy backgrounds and were socially prominent, often from families with ancestral ties to the Founding Fathers of the United States. Returning once again to a familiar theme, Cunningham emphasized that the unique "sisterhood" she had assembled enabled would enable the MVLA to rise above sectional strife.

Historian Patricia West categorizes the early vice regents of the MVLA as preservationists, figureheads, and activists. Vice regents such as Anna Cora Mowatt Ritchie of Virginia and Octavia Walton Le Vert of Alabama took a keen interest in historical preservation, influenced by their own experiences in Europe. As an actress, Anna Cora Mowatt had been particularly enthusiastic about the preservation of the birthplace of William Shakespeare in Stratford-upon-Avon. Similarly, Madame Le Vert had been impressed with the preservation of the home of the poet Ludovico Ariosto in Ferrara, Italy, which had been purchased by the government and maintained as a "shrine" for those who wished to pay their respects.

In the category of figureheads, West includes Mary Chesnut, vice regent of South Carolina, who served from 1860 until her death in 1861. She was the mother-in-law of Civil War diarist Mary Boykin Chesnut, and had been a personal acquaintance of George Washington himself.

Notable among the activists was Mary Morris Hamilton of New York, the granddaughter of the U.S. Treasury Secretary Alexander Hamilton and the niece of U.S. Senator Gouverneur Morris. During her early years as vice regent, Hamilton managed to raise nearly $40,000, or one-fifth of the purchase price for Mount Vernon. Hamilton's lady managers for New York included Caroline C. Fillmore, the second wife of former President Millard Fillmore; former First Lady of New York Frances Adeline Seward; and the novelist Caroline Kirkland. In addition, the New York committee included the wives of the historian George Bancroft and architect Andrew Jackson Downing.

Other vice regents who contributed significantly to the cause included Louisa Ingersoll Gore Greenough of Massachusetts, who enlisted Anna Cora Mowatt to visit and do readings. Massachusetts managed to raise some $20,000 above and beyond any contribution credited to Everett. Octavia Le Vert of Alabama raised over $10,000; Margaret Gordon Blanding of California raised $9,500; Lily Lytle Macalester of Pennsylvania raised nearly $9,000; and North Carolina raised $8,000.

Other supporters 

Edward Everett, a prominent politician who had served as U.S. Secretary of State, U.S. Senator, Governor of Massachusetts, and President of Harvard University, was an early proponent of the Mount Vernon Ladies' Association. He viewed Mount Vernon as a powerful rallying point for national unity and political moderation that could prevent a civil war.

A popular orator who would later become known as "the other speaker at Gettysburg," Everett toured the country to raise money for the MVLA. Between 1856 and 1860, he delivered his speech, "The Character of Washington," 137 times to fee-paying audiences. He also entered into a one-year contract with The New York Ledger to write a weekly column on American history in exchange for an advance of $10,000 to be paid to the Mount Vernon Ladies' Association.

Everett appointed three trustees in Boston to hold the money he raised and invest it, so it would earn interest. In the end, he contributed a total of $69,024, or a little more than one-third of the purchase price of Mount Vernon.

While Everett drummed up support among Northerners by portraying George Washington as a nationalist, Southern secessionist leader William Lowndes Yancey raised money for the MVLA by touring the Southern states with his own lecture praising Washington as a leader against government tyranny. A cousin of Ann Pamela Cunningham, Yancey was known for his "ferocious sarcasm" as an orator, and his uncompromising defense of the constitutional right to hold slaves. The Northern and Southern wings of the MVLA thus both appeared to celebrate the legacy of George Washington, while taking opposing stances on the issue of slavery and states' rights.

Opposition from other abolitionists 
During their fundraising efforts, the vice regents of the Mount Vernon Ladies' Association faced opposition from abolitionists and others who objected to Mount Vernon's status as a slave plantation. Vice Regent Abba Isabella Chamberlain Little of Maine reported that some Northerners refused to contribute based on principle, even if it meant yielding Washington's legacy to the South. In Minnesota, Vice Regent Sarah Jane Steele Sibley found that the main obstacles to fundraising to be financial hardship resulting from the Panic of 1857; discomfort with the notion that a slave plantation could be a historical site of worthy of preservation; and tepidness from political opponents of her husband, Democratic Governor Henry Hastings Sibley. 

In August 1858, suffragist Elizabeth Cady Stanton was widely applauded in abolitionist newspapers for refusing Mary Morris Hamilton's invitation to serve as the lady manager for upstate New York. Stanton stated that she was "pledged to a higher and holier work than building monuments, or gathering up the sacred memories of the venerated dead." Instead, she felt that actively working to abolish slavery in the United States was the "purest" tribute to Washington's memory. Similarly, in November 1858, Elizabeth B. Chace declined an invitation to serve as a lady manager for Rhode Island, pointing out the irony of upholding the "moral value" of Mount Vernon as a symbol of America's fight for liberty, when one in six women in America remained subject to slavery.

Purchase of Mount Vernon 
To the alarm of Ann Pamela Cunningham, shortly after the 1856 charter establishing the Mount Vernon Ladies' Association of the Union was passed by the Virginia General Assembly, John Augustine Washington abruptly withdrew the Mount Vernon estate from sale. He reportedly felt humiliated by the charter's stipulation that he should turn over his estate to the MVLA rather than to the state of Virginia; he was also clearly offended by the public criticism and personal attacks he had endured while the Virginia legislature considered his "exorbitant" asking price for Mount Vernon.   

In June 1856, Cunningham visited John Augustine Washington in person to convince him to reconsider. Cunningham later wrote that she had persuaded Washington to change his mind by commiserating with his frustration that the state of Virginia had been unwilling to assume ownership of Mount Vernon, apparently moving him to tears. Meanwhile, John Augustine Washington wrote to William Foushee Ritchie that he still thought the MVLA's plan was "preposterous"; he predicted the women would mismanage the estate and that Mount Vernon would eventually revert to Virginia anyway. 

For the next few years, Cunningham kept in regular contact with John Augustine Washington, assuring him that she was defending his honor – and his asking price for Mount Vernon – at every turn. On one occasion, she sent him a newspaper article in which she had rebuked John Augustine Washington's critics as "a band of 'abolitionists' playing into the hands of 'speculators'".    

On April 6, 1858, John Augustine Washington III finally signed a contract to sell Mount Vernon to the MVLA. He agreed to sell the mansion, outbuildings, and 202 surrounding acres to the Association for $200,000. He took an immediate down payment of $18,000, with an additional $57,000 payable in December, and the remaining balance to be paid in four annual installments on February 22, which was George Washington's birthday.

John Augustine Washington continued to court national controversy when on December 25, 1858, he ran his third annual advertisement in the Alexandria Gazette offering the services of his seven slaves for hire. Editor Horace Greeley of the New York Tribune published a scathing article condemning his actions while encouraging the MVLA to finally take Mount Vernon away from his clutches. Other abolitionists questioned whether it made sense to contribute money if John Augustine Washington refused to free his slaves.

In the end, the Mount Vernon Ladies' Association of the Union met its fundraising target and paid the full amount in less than two years, despite the economic depression. John Augustine Washington and his family moved out of the mansion and the MVLA finally took possession of the estate on February 22, 1860.

Civil War and post-war years 
In 1874, Ann Pamela Cunningham wrote to the Mount Vernon Ladies' Association Council announcing her retirement as regent: Ladies, the home of Washington is in your charge – see to it that you keep it the home of Washington. Let no irreverent hand change it; no vandal hands desecrate it with the fingers of progress. Those who go to the home in which he lived and died wish to see in what he lived and died. Let one spot in this grand country of ours be saved from change. Upon you rests this duty.

Vice regents of Mount Vernon Ladies' Association to 1874 
The table below lists the first vice regents of the Mount Vernon Ladies' Association of the Union to 1874.

Other preservation projects

Preservation of view 
Congresswoman Frances P. Bolton, who served as Vice Regent from Ohio from 1938 to 1977, launched an effort in the 1940s to preserve the view across the Potomac River. The Association purchased  along the (opposite) Maryland shore, which became the nucleus of the  Piscataway Park. This has helped preserve the landscape as the Washingtons would have seen it.

Books owned by George Washington 
On June 22, 2012, the Association purchased Washington's personal copy of the United States Constitution at auction for $9.8 million. The bound volume was specially printed for Washington in 1789, his first year in office as president, and contains his handwritten notes and markings. George Washington books and manuscripts purchased by the Mount Vernon Ladies' Association are safeguarded in The Fred W. Smith National Library for the Study of George Washington.

Awards
2002 National Humanities Medal

References

Sources
"Annual report" – The Mount Vernon Ladies' Association of the Union (1896)
 "Portraits/Biographies of Regent and Vice Regents to 1874", MVLA – Portraits & Bios
"Mount Vernon Lands Diminish", Old and Sold, 1925
 Thane, Elswyth (1966). Mount Vernon is Ours: The Story of the Preservation and Restoration of Washington's Home. New York: Duell, Sloan and Pearce.

External links 

 Mount Vernon Ladies' Association

Historical societies of the United States
National Humanities Medal recipients
1853 establishments in Virginia
Organizations established in 1853
Mount Vernon
History of women in Virginia